Adolphe Joseph Choler (1821 – 19 January 1889) was a French playwright and librettist who was born in and died in Paris. He was Saint-Agnan Choler's brother.

His plays were presented on the most important Parisian venues of the 19th century: Théâtre de la Porte Saint-Martin, Théâtre des Variétés, Théâtre du Palais-Royal, Théâtre du Gymnase-dramatique etc. He was managing director of the Théâtre du Palais-Royal from 1868 to 1879.

Works 

1842: Eva ou le Grillon du foyer, comédie en vaudevilles in 2 acts, with Saint-Yves
1847: Mademoiselle Grabutot, vaudeville in one act, with Saint-Yves
1848: Candide ou Tout est pour le mieux, conte mêlé de couplets in 3 acts and 5 tableaux, with Clairville and Saint-Yves
1848: La république de Platon, vaudeville in 1 act, with Saint-Yves
1849: Madame veuve Larifla, vaudeville in 1 act, with Labiche
1849: Le Marquis de Carabas et la princesse Fanfreluche, tale by Perrault in 1 act, mixed with distichs, with Adolphe d'Ennery
1849: La paix du ménage, comédie en vaudevilles in 1 act, with Saint-Yves
1850: Charles le Téméraire, comédie en vaudevilles in 1 act, with Saint-Agnan Choler and Auguste Lefranc
1851: Belphégor, vaudeville fantastique in 1 act, with Dumanoir, Saint-Yves
1851: La Fille de Frétillon, vaudeville in 1 act, with Saint-Yves
1851: Le Mari d'une jolie femme, comédie en vaudevilles in 1 act, with Saint-Yves
1852: Le terrible savoyard, folie-vaudeville in 1 act, with the Cogniard brothers
1852: Le Bal de la Halle, à-propos-vaudeville in 2 acts, with Clairville
1852: Cinq gaillards, dont deux gaillardes, mêli-mêlo, mixed with one distinct, with Lefranc and Siraudin
1852: Marie Simon, drama in 5 acts, with Jules-Édouard Alboize de Pujol and Saint-Yves
1852: Prunes et chinois, vaudeville in 1 act, with Hippolyte Cogniard
1854: L'Enfant de la halle, drama-vaudeville in 3 acts, with Saint-Agnan Choler and Eugène Vachette
1854: Gusman ne connait pas d'obstacles !, vaudeville in 4 acts, with the Cogniard brothers
1854: L'héritage de ma tante, comédie en vaudevilles in 1 act, with Saint-Yves
1854: Les marquises de la fourchette, vaudeville en 1 acte, avec Labiche
1855: La dame de Francboisy, historical vaudeville which didn't happen, with Siraudin
1855: Un cœur qui parle, comédie en vaudevilles in 1 act, with Nérée Désarbres
1857: La Gammina, parodie de La Fiammina, in 4 acts, preceded by Vingt ans avant, prologue, with Siraudin
1857: Le Nez d'argent, vaudeville in 1 act, with Delacour and Saint-Yves
1858: Le fils de la belle au bois dormant, féerie in 3 acts and 10 tableaux, with Lambert-Thiboust and Siraudin
1858: L'Avocat du diable, comedy in 1 act, with Marc Michel
1858: La Soirée périlleuse, comédie mêlée de couplets, in 1 act, with Marc Michel
1859: Amoureux de la bourgeoise !, vaudeville in 1 act, with Paul Siraudin
1859: Les Deux maniaques, comédie en vaudevilles in 1 acte, with Émile Colliot and Armand Lapointe
1859: Les Mêli-mêlo de la rue Meslay, comédie en vaudevilles in 1 act, with Marc Michel
1859: Note relative aux droits de Mozart et de Weber
1859: Paris s'amuse !, comédie en vaudevilles in 3 acts, with Saint-Agnan Choler
1859: Le rouge-gorge, vaudeville in 1 act, with Labiche
1860: Comment on gâte sa vie, comédie en vaudevilles in 3 acts, with Saint-Yves
1860: Fou-Yo-Po, a study of Chinese mores in 1 act, with Siraudin and Delacour
1860: J'ai perdu mon Eurydice, comédie en vaudevilles in 1 act, with Marc Michel
1861: Bébé-actrice, parody-vaudeville in 1 act, with Siraudin
1861: Deux nez sur une piste, comédie en vaudevilles in 1 act, with Marc Michel
1861: Les Rameneurs, vaudeville in 1 act, with Siraudin
1862: Après le bal, comedy in 1 act, mixed with distichs, with Alfred Delacour and Paul Siraudin
1862: Un avocat du beau sexe, comédie en vaudevilles in 1 act, with Siraudin
1862: Le Cotillon, à-propos mixed with distichs, with Clairville
1862: Les Finesses de Bouchavanes, comedy in 1 act, mixed with song, with Marc Michel
1864: Les Fiancés de Rosa, opéra comique in 1 act
1864: Les Pinceaux d'Héloïse, vaudeville in 1 act, with Henri Rochefort
1864: La Vieillesse de Brididi, vaudeville in 1 act, with Rochefort
1865: Une Dame du lac, comédie en vaudevilles in 1 act
1865: Une femme dégelée, vaudeville in 1 act, with Clairville and Saint-Yves
1865: Le Procès Van Korn, vaudeville in 1 act, with Rochefort
1866: Un pied dans le crime, comédie en vaudevilles in 3 acts, with Labiche
1867: Les chemins de fer, comédie en vaudevilles in 5 acts, with Alfred Delacour and Eugène Labiche
1867: L'Homme masqué et le Sanglier de Bougival, athletic and literary foly in 1 act, with the Cogniard brothers
1868: Mademoiselle Pacifique, comédie en vaudevilles in 1 act, with Saint-Yves
1883: Six demoiselles à marier, operetta bouffa in 1 act, with Léo Delibes

Bibliography 
 Louis Gustave Vapereau, Dictionnaire universel des contemporains, 1870, (p. 395)
 Octave Uzanne, Le Livre n°1, 1889, (p. 166) (obituary)
 T. J. Walsh, Second Empire Opera: The Théâtre Lyrique, Paris 1851-1870, 1981, (p. 345)

19th-century French dramatists and playwrights
French theatre managers and producers
French librettists
Writers from Paris
1821 births
1889 deaths